K. V. Vijayadas (25 May 1959 – 18 January 2021) was an Indian politician who served as a Member of the Kerala Legislative Assembly for Kongad from 2011 till his death from COVID-19. He had tested positive for the COVID-19 earlier and died on 18 January 2021 at Thrissur Medical College.

References 

1959 births
2021 deaths
Members of the Kerala Legislative Assembly
People from Palakkad district
Communist Party of India (Marxist) politicians from Kerala
Deaths from the COVID-19 pandemic in India